The 1947 Championship of New South Wales was a motor race held at Nowra in New South Wales, Australia on 16 June 1947.
It was staged over 25 laps of a circuit, 4 mile and 670 yards in length, laid out on the runways and connecting taxiways of the RAAF aerodrome.
The total race distance was approximately 110 miles.
The race, which was organised by the Australian Sporting Car Club, was contested on a handicap basis with the three "limit men" starting off a handicap of 24 minutes.

The contest was originally to have been titled the New South Wales Grand Prix however advice was received from the AAA one week before the event informing the organisers that they would not be permitted to use that name.

The race was won by Tom Lancey driving an MG TC.

Results

Notes
 Entries: 38
 Attendance: 15,000 (organising club's estimate)
 Fastest lap: Alf Barrett (Alfa Romeo Monza s/c) 2:52 (92.9 mph)
 Fastest time: Alf Barrett (Alfa Romeo Monza s/c) 1:17:41

References

External links
 Big Crowd Sees Manly Driver Win Grand Prix, Sydney Morning Herald (NSW : 1842 - 1954), Tuesday 17 June 1947, page 9, as archived at trove.nla.gov.au
 Lancey Wins Nowra Grand Prix, Newcastle Morning Herald and Miners' Advocate, Tuesday 17 June 1947, page 10, as archived at trove.nla.gov.au
 1947 Championship of New South Wales-Nowra…, primotipo.com

Championship of New South Wales
Motorsport in New South Wales
Sports competitions in New South Wales